Frederick Marrant Robertson (1843 – 28 March 1920) was an English first-class cricketer active 1871–80 who played for Surrey. He was born in Cape Town; died in Kensington.

References

1843 births
1920 deaths
English cricketers
Surrey cricketers